The Emergency: A Personal History is a 2015 book by Indian journalist Coomi Kapoor.

The book is a personal reflection on the impact of The Emergency, when Indira Gandhi suspended democracy and civil liberties, on Kapoor and her family. Her husband, also a journalist was imprisoned and her family faced threats and harassment from security forces. The book also recounts the broader impact of the Emergency on Indian society. The book recalls the "drama the horror, as well as the heroism of a few, during those nineteen months, 40 years ago, when democracy was derailed".

Reception

In Business Standard, Shreekant Sambrani praises the book as a "readable and thought-provoking personal account" and "immensely readable and engrossing" while in The Indian Express Pratap Bhanu Mehta also praises the book, describing it as a "riveting and necessary account of the elite politics of the Emergency".

References

Books about politics of India
Works about the Emergency (India)
Viking Press books
21st-century Indian books
2015 non-fiction books